The Chinese ambassador to the Association of Southeast Asian Nations is the official representative of the government in Beijing to the Association of Southeast Asian Nations.

List of representatives

See also
China–Association of Southeast Asian Nations relations

References

External links
   

Association of Southeast Asian Nations
China